Haparanda Nyheter ('Haparanda News') was a Swedish-language twice-weekly newspaper published from Haparanda, Sweden, between 1916 and 1917. It was linked to the Finnish-language newspaper Haaparannan sanomat. Pär Axelsson was the editor of the newspaper.

References

1916 establishments in Sweden
1917 disestablishments in Sweden
Defunct newspapers published in Sweden
Newspapers published in Sweden
Publications established in 1916
Publications disestablished in 1917
Swedish-language newspapers